Bibirevo ethnographic village  is a park in the "Green zone of the  river" in Moscow, stylized as an ethnographic village. The area of the park (green area) is 9.58 hectares, the total area is 12 hectares.

History 

In 1983, one of the episodes of the children's newsreel Yeralash was filmed here (37th issue, 1st plot entitled "Ladies and Gentlemen").

Work on the creation of the park began in 2003.

The park was opened on 24 July 2004 in place of an abandoned and swampy territory along the Chermyanka River.

The next stage of the park's reconstruction took place in the summer and autumn of 2012. The slopes were strengthened, paths were paved, stairs, playgrounds for children, a summer amphitheater were built.

Modernity 
In the floodplain of the Chermyanka River there is a dam, flower beds, playgrounds and sports grounds, a summer stage, picnic areas. Also, during the reconstruction in 2012, new wooden pedestrian bridges were built across the river, a wooden embankment (footpaths with wooden flooring) along the river.

On the territory of the recreational zone there is a chapel-church in honor of Saints Anthony and Theodosius of Kiev-Pechersk.

References

Sources 
 
 Газета «Звёздный бульвар» от 23.06.2014
 bibirevo-svao.ru 
 Газета «Звёздный бульвар» от 18 June 2014
 Этнографическая деревня в Бибирево
 На сайте Лианозовского парка  (архивная копия старой версии страницы).
 На сайте gorod.mos.ru

Parks and gardens in Moscow
Ethnographic villages